Pylaia is a former municipality in the Thessaloniki Prefecture of Greece. In the 2011 local government reform, Thessaloniki Prefecture became the regional unit of Thessaloniki (without boundary changes), and Pylaia became a part of the new municipality of Pylaia-Chortiatis. Pylaia continues under its old boundaries as a municipal unit within Pylaia-Chortiatis.

Pylaia covers 24.379 km2 with 4.5 km of coastline extending along the shores of the Thermaic Gulf and had a population of 34,625 at the 2011 census. Pylaia is relatively sparsely populated for a municipal unit within the Thessaloniki Urban Area.

History
The first reference to Pylaia is found in the historian Thucydides, in 319 BC, under the name Strepsa. It was later known as Kapoutzida, from the Turkish word kapıcı ("gatekeeper"), deriving from the guards watching over the city walls of Byzantine Thessaloniki. The current name came into general use in 1927, and is derived from the word Pyle (πύλη), meaning gateway and referring to the Eastern Entrance of the city.

Sports clubs
 Ethnikos Pylaias, football, volleyball, founded 1950

Communities
Eleones

References

External links
Official website 

Populated places in Thessaloniki (regional unit)